Shahrak Ashayiri-ye Khosrin (also Romanized as Shahrak-e ʿAshāyrī Khosrīn; also known as Khosrī and Khosrīn) is a village in Dalgan Rural District, in the Central District of Dalgan County, Sistan and Baluchestan Province, Iran. At the 2006 census, its population was 663, in 119 families.

References 

Populated places in Dalgan County